, also known by his Chinese style name , was a bureaucrat of the Ryukyu Kingdom.

Kunigami was the eldest son of Kunigami Seikan, and was also a grandson of Kunigami Seiin. He served as Sanshikan during King Shō Gen's reign.

Amami Ōshima revolted and refused to pay tribute in 1571. A troops led by King Shō Gen to suppress them, but the king got sick seriously on the way. Kunigami prayed to heaven and said that he would like to replace the king to die. Magically, the king was full recovery and quickly put down the rebellion, but Kunigami died. The king was moved, and promoted his son, Kunigami Seichi, to the rank of Aji, and established an aristocrat family: Kunigami Udun. This was the only one Aji family which had no royal blood, and Kunigami Seikaku was regarded as the third head of Kunigami Udun posthumously.

References

1571 deaths
People of the Ryukyu Kingdom
Ryukyuan people
16th-century Ryukyuan people
Ueekata
Sanshikan